Nuclear Medicine, Oncology and Radiotherapy Institute (NORI)  is the 7th Cancer hospital and research centre; established by Pakistan Atomic Energy Commission (PAEC) in 1983 at Islamabad, adjacent to the Pakistan Institute of Medical Sciences (PIMS) to caterer Patients from Islamabad and adjoining areas. NORI is the first institute which has been recognized by College of Physicians and Surgeons of Pakistan (CPSP) for training of Fellows of College of Physicians and Surgeons (FCPS) in Nuclear Medicine and radiotherapy. Various research projects sponsored by the International Atomic Energy Agency (IAEA) and the World Health Organization (WHO), are underway in the NORI Cancer Hospital. The hospital is providing treatment facilities to about 40,000 patients from Islamabad, Hazara, Jhelum, Sargodha, Azad Kashmir, etc.

Units and departments 
The Institute has the following department

Nuclear Medicine Department
Radiotherapy & Oncology Department
Medical Physics Department

Projects 
The following projects are underway in the Institution. Some of them are  recently completed.

Study of relationship between gastroesophageal reflux, recurrent lower respiratory tract infection and bronchial asthma in infants and children.
To assess the diagnostic accuracy of Tc-99m MIBI Planar and SPECT in differentiating scarred tissues from recurrence of cancer after breast surgery.
Nuclear medicine and Radiotherapy support.
Thematic health programme.
Radiotherapy
Clinical application of radiosensitizers in cancer radiotherapy in Pakistan.
Randomized clinical trial of radiotherapy combined with Mitomycin-C.
Randomized Multi Center study of radiotherapy in the treatment of Squamous Cell Carcinoma of Head and Neck.
Incidence of hypercalcemia in solid malignancies.
Role of gemcitabine as radiation sensitizer.

See also 
Nuclear medicine in Pakistan
List of Cancer Hospitals (Pakistan)

References

External links 

Nuclear research institutes
Hospital buildings completed in 1983
Cancer hospitals in Pakistan
Hospitals in Islamabad